Yi Jianlian (born October 27, 1987) is a Chinese professional basketball player for the Guangdong Southern Tigers of the Chinese Basketball Association (CBA). He has also played in the National Basketball Association (NBA) for the Milwaukee Bucks, the New Jersey Nets, the Washington Wizards, and the Dallas Mavericks.

Yi joined the Guangdong Southern Tigers for the 2002–03 CBA season, and subsequently won the CBA Rookie of the Year award. In his first five years with Guangdong, the team won three CBA titles. In the 2007 NBA draft, he was selected by the Milwaukee Bucks with the sixth overall pick. Initially, Yi declined to sign with Milwaukee for several months before agreeing to a contract with them in August 2007. He later played for three other NBA teams until returning to the Guangdong Southern Tigers in 2012.

Yi also plays for the Chinese national team, having represented his country at the Olympics in 2004, 2008, 2012 and 2016, as well as the 2006 and 2010 FIBA World Championships. Yi played in the 2004 Olympics.

Early life 
As a child, Yi's parents did not allow him to join a sports school, which is designed for children predicted to be future professional athletes. However, a sports school's basketball coach who noticed Yi's potential in playing street basketball persuaded Yi's family to allow him to train professionally. Hoping to sign Yi to an endorsement deal, Adidas invited him to attend the company's ABCD Camp in New Jersey in 2002, where he competed against all-American high school players.

Age controversy 
In 2004, Yi was listed as being born in 1984 during the Four Nation Tournament, but Chinese officials said that it was probably a typographical error. Two years later, Fran Blinebury of The Houston Chronicle reported that Yi told Shane Battier he was 24 years old in an exhibition game before the 2006 FIBA World Championship, but the story was refuted by both Yi and Battier. Yi is not the first Chinese basketball player to come under scrutiny for age discrepancy, as former NBA player Wang Zhizhi had been listed as being born in both 1977 and 1979. In 2006, a senior Chinese official admitted that past youth squads had included players above the permitted age.

In 2007 and 2008, Yi's date of birth was further scrutinized as being 27 October 1984, including a Chinese reporter discovering a high school enrollment form from 1997 that listed Yi as being born on 27 October 1984.

Professional career

Guangdong Southern Tigers (2002–2007) 
After returning to China in 2002, Yi signed a professional contract with Chinese Basketball Association side Guangdong Southern Tigers and averaged 3.5 points and 1.9 rebounds per game in his first season. He also averaged 7.3 points and 7.3 rebounds per game in four games during the playoffs, and won the Rookie of the Year award. Yi was featured in TIMEs August 2003 article titled "The Next Yao Ming". In each of his next three seasons, Yi led Guangdong to the CBA championship and he was awarded the CBA finals' most valuable player honor in 2006. In Yi's final season in the Chinese Basketball Association before he entered the 2007 NBA draft, he averaged a career-high 24.9 points and 11.5 rebounds per game, but his team lost to the Bayi Rockets in the playoff finals.

Milwaukee Bucks (2007–2008) 
Yi was not expected to enter the NBA draft until 2009 because the Chinese Basketball Association ruled that players are not allowed to leave for foreign leagues until they turned 22. In early 2006, however, Yi announced that he would enter the 2006 NBA draft although he eventually decided to withdraw, saying he was "not good enough to compete in the NBA and needed more experience." Later that year, the Guangdong Southern Tigers announced that Yi would enter the 2007 NBA draft.

Yi chose Dan Fegan as his agent to represent him in the NBA draft and flew to Los Angeles to participate in pre-NBA draft camps. Before the draft, Yi was predicted by many to be picked anywhere from third to twelfth. On 28 June 2007, Yi was selected by the Milwaukee Bucks with the sixth overall pick in the 2007 NBA draft, despite Fegan warning the Milwaukee Bucks not to pick Yi and not allowing them to be one of the teams invited to Yi's pre-draft private workouts in Los Angeles. Fegan did not want Milwaukee to select Yi because the city of Milwaukee did not have a large Asian-American community. However, Milwaukee's general manager Larry Harris said they had only drafted the best player available to them. Yi and Sun Yue together marked the first time in NBA draft history where two Chinese born players were selected in the same draft, which was a feat that would not be repeated again until 2016.

After the draft, Milwaukee attempted to convince Yi to sign with the team and on 2 July 2007, the owner of the Bucks franchise, Herb Kohl, wrote a letter to Yi and his representatives, hoping to persuade Yi to sign with the team. Three days later, head coach Larry Krystkowiak and Harris met with Yi, attempting to influence him to play for Milwaukee, however, Yi's representatives requested that the team trade Yi to another team with a city that had a large Chinese presence. Chinese officials also required that any team Yi played for would have to give him sufficient playing time for him to improve for the 2008 Summer Olympics. Kohl made a special trip to Hong Kong to appeal to Yi personally and he assured Chinese officials that Yi would have sufficient playing time. On 29 August 2007, the Milwaukee Bucks and Yi agreed to a standard, multi-year rookie contract.
Yi was named to Milwaukee's starting lineup by head coach Larry Krystkowiak in place of Charlie Villanueva to begin the 2007–08 season. He recorded nine points and three rebounds in a debut loss to the Orlando Magic. He played his first home game in Milwaukee three days later and scored 16 points while grabbing eight rebounds in a 78–72 win over the Chicago Bulls. The game was also Yi's first game to be televised nationally in China, where it was watched by an estimated 100 million viewers. Yao Ming praised Yi's play in his first few games, saying, "If you compare us in our third NBA games, you will see that Yi's statistics are far better than mine."

On 9 November 2007, Yi played against Yao Ming for the first time when the Houston Rockets hosted Milwaukee in a 104–88 loss. Yi recorded 19 points and nine rebounds, including two three-pointers, while Yao recorded 28 points and nine rebounds. The game between the two was watched by over 200 million people in China, making it one of the most-watched games in NBA history. After the game, Yao called Yi's talent "unbelievable" and Tracy McGrady said that Yi had a "tremendous upside in this league". Del Harris, the former head coach of the Chinese national basketball team, also described Yi as the "most athletic 7-footer in the NBA."

Yi was named the NBA Rookie of the Month for December 2007 after averaging 12.1 points and 6.6 rebounds per game that month, while scoring a career-high 29 points on 14-of-17 shooting in a win over the Charlotte Bobcats on December 22. On 30 January 2008, he was selected for the rookie team in the Rookie Challenge at the 2008 NBA All-Star Game. On 2 February 2008, Yi faced Yao for the second time when Milwaukee played at home against Houston, which Krystkowiak dubbed the "Chinese Super Bowl." However, both players struggled during Houston's 91–83 victory over Milwaukee. Yao scored 12 points while Yi injured his shoulder during the game, finishing with just six points.

On 2 April 2008, it was announced that Yi would miss the rest of the season with a knee injury. Having already missed eight games with other injuries, Yi managed 66 out of a possible 82 games in his rookie season, averaging 8.6 points and 5.2 rebounds per game. One of Milwaukee's assistant coaches, Brian James, later said that "the injuries he had bothered him more than people realized, and he couldn't play through them."

New Jersey Nets (2008–2010) 

On 26 June 2008, Yi was traded by the Milwaukee Bucks along with Bobby Simmons to the New Jersey Nets in exchange for Richard Jefferson. New Jersey's team president Rod Thorn said that "we feel strongly he's going to be a real good player," and the team's chief executive Brett Yormark said "it opens up a truly new fan base for us." Yi stated that he didn't expect to be traded, but that it was "an honor to join the Nets."

Through his first 37 games with New Jersey, Yi averaged 10.5 points and 6.2 rebounds per game while shooting 39% from behind the three-point line, which was well above his average from the previous season. But on 9 January 2009, Yi broke the pinkie on his right hand and was expected to miss four to six weeks. Thorn called it "lousy timing" because "he'd been playing well," but Yi said "(I'll) just take my time. I'll come back." In voting for the 2009 NBA All-Star Game, Yi finished third in total votes for forwards in the Eastern Conference, ahead of players such as Paul Pierce and Chris Bosh.

Yi made his return from injury after the 2009 NBA All-Star Game in a loss to the Houston Rockets on 17 February 2009. However, after averaging only six points on 36% shooting after his return, Yi was removed from the team's starting lineup. His final averages for the season were 8.6 points and 5.3 rebounds per game, as well as a 38% shooting percentage from the field and 34% on three-point field goals. After New Jersey finished the season outside of the playoffs, Yi's agent Dan Fegan suggested New Jersey played better when Yi played more minutes and took more shots, and asks "who's accountable?" New Jersey's head coach Lawrence Frank said that "you have to be patient. He's only 21", and Yi assessed his season by saying he was "still too much up and down."

In the 2009–10 season, Yi returned to the starting lineup for New Jersey. Starting in every game he played but one, Yi suffered several injuries during the season which made him miss 30 games. He sprained his medial collateral ligament on 4 November 2009, had a laceration on his upper lip on 8 December 2009, and sprained his left ankle on 8 March 2010. His final averages for the season were 12 points and 7.2 rebounds per game, as well as a 40% shooting percentage from the field and 37% on three-point field goals.

Washington Wizards (2010–2011) 

On 29 June 2010, Yi was traded to the Washington Wizards along with $3 million in cash considerations for Quinton Ross. Yi ended the 2010–11 season averaging 5.6 points and 3.9 rebounds per game. Washington had until 30 June 2011 to extend Yi's contract but decided not to do so.

Return to the Tigers (2011) 
During the 2011 NBA lockout, Yi signed a one-year contract to return to the Guangdong Southern Tigers. Unlike most NBA players who went to the Chinese Basketball Association during that time, he received an option to return to the NBA once the lockout had been resolved.

Dallas Mavericks (2012) 
On 6 January 2012, Yi signed with the Dallas Mavericks to a one-year contract after starting the season with the Guangdong Southern Tigers. He was immediately assigned to Dallas' D-League affiliate team, the Texas Legends. Yi benefited from the new collective bargaining agreement rules which allowed players with more than two years of NBA experience to be assigned to the D-League with the players' consent. On 9 January 2012, after playing two games for the Texas Legends, averaging 23 points and 12 rebounds per game, he was recalled by Dallas. The team faced the Oklahoma City Thunder in the playoffs and in Game 3 of the playoff series, Yi played in his first NBA playoffs game, where he scored two points for the team in five minutes.

Third stint in Guangdong (2012–present) 
Yi re-joined the Guangdong Southern Tigers for the 2012–13 CBA season and went on to win a fourth championship that season.

On August 22, 2016, Yi signed a one-year, $8 million contract with the Los Angeles Lakers, returning to the NBA for the first time since 2012. Lakers head coach Luke Walton considered Yi to be the team's best-shooting big man during the preseason, but did not provide Yi with much of a role. Yi averaged 3.0 points and 2.5 rebounds in 10.7 minutes per game over six contests with the Lakers during the preseason. Feeling he would have better opportunities elsewhere, Yi requested a release from the Lakers prior to the start of the regular season. The Lakers waived him on October 24, 2016.

In October 2016, Yi returned to Guangdong after spending training camp with the Los Angeles Lakers.

On August 15, 2020, Yi helped the Guangdong Southern Tigers in winning their 10th CBA Championship after a 123–115 win in Game 3 of the CBA Finals over the Liaoning Flying Leopards, but Yi had suffered a ruptured Achilles' tendon during the game and was expected to miss a major part of 2020–21 CBA season due to rehabilitation.

National team career 

Yi's first major international experience came at the 2003 FIBA Under-19 World Championship in which he averaged 18.9 points and 11.5 rebounds per game. He made his debut with the Chinese national basketball team during the 2004 Summer Olympics and averaged 6 points and 6 rebounds per game at the 2006 FIBA World Championship. His performance impressed coaches on the Chinese national team as well as the coaches from other countries.

In 2008, Yi was once again selected to play for the Chinese national team at the 2008 Summer Olympics. In China's first two group stage matches, Yi scored 9 and 4 points respectively, and China lost both their games against the United States and Spain. But in a win against Angola, Yi recorded a double-double, and in a win against Germany, Yi recorded 9 points and 11 rebounds, and hit the crucial shot with 28 seconds left to help China advance to the quarter-finals. However, Lithuania ended China's run by beating them 94–68, as Yi scored 11 points for his side.

Yi, along with former NBA player Sun Yue, was a member of the Chinese national team that played at the 2009 FIBA Asia Championship and the 2011 FIBA Asia Championship. Yi was named the most valuable player of the 2011 FIBA Asia Championship, averaging 16.6 points and 10.8 rebounds per game. Yi also played for the Chinese national team during the 2012 Summer Olympics, ranking first in rebounds per game with 10.2 per game and ranking second in blocks with 2.2 per game. He also played at the 2016 Summer Olympics. During 2019 FIBA Basketball World Cup. Yi was still the leader in the Chinese national team , averaging 17.8 points, 7.8 rebounds, 1.2 assists. In the match with Nigeria, he played the best performance of the national team in recent years. Yi got 27 points and Player efficiency is 26.

Personal life 
Yi is fluent in both Mandarin and his native tongue of Cantonese. He was ranked fourth on Forbes China Celebrity 100 in income and popularity in 2008. In 2008, Yi donated 100,000 yuan to support the 2008 Sichuan earthquake victims and also participated in the 2008 Summer Olympics' torch relay by carrying the torch during the Hainan leg of the relay.

 Career statistics 
 CBA 

 NBA 

 Regular season 

|-
| align="left" | 
| align="left" | Milwaukee
| 66 || 49 || 25.0 || .421 || .286 || .841 || 5.2 || .8 || .5 || .8 || 8.6
|-
| align="left" | 
| align="left" | New Jersey
| 61 || 52 || 23.3 || .382 || .343 || .772 ||5.3 || 1.0 || .5 || .6 || 8.6
|-
| align="left" | 
| align="left" | New Jersey
| 52 || 51 || 31.8 || .403 || .366 || .798 || 7.2 || .9 || .7 || 1.0 || 12.0'
|-
| align="left" | 
| align="left" | Washington
| 63 || 11 || 17.7 || .418 || .231 || .681 || 3.9 || .4 || .4 || .5 || 5.6
|-
| align="left" | 
| align="left" | Dallas
| 30 || 0 || 6.8 || .378 || .300 || .667 || 1.6 || .2 || .2 || .3 || 2.6
|- class="sortbottom"
| align="left" | Career
| align="left" |
| 272 || 163 || 22.2 || .404 || .333 || .780 || 4.9 || 0.7 || 0.5 || 0.7 || 7.9

Playoffs 

|-
| align="left" | 2012
| align="left" | Dallas
| 1 || 0 || 5.0 || .333 || .000 || .000 || 2.0 || .0 || 1.0 || .0 || 2.0
|- class="sortbottom"
| align="left" | Career
| align="left" |
| 1 || 0 || 5.0 || .333 || .000 || .000 || 2.0 || .0 || 1.0 || .0 || 2.0

References

External links 

 Yi Jianlian at nba.com

1987 births
Living people
Age controversies
Asian Games gold medalists for China
Asian Games medalists in basketball
Basketball players at the 2004 Summer Olympics
Basketball players at the 2006 Asian Games
Basketball players at the 2008 Summer Olympics
Basketball players at the 2012 Summer Olympics
Basketball players at the 2016 Summer Olympics
Basketball players from Guangdong
Cantonese people
Chinese men's basketball players
Chinese expatriate basketball people in the United States
Dallas Mavericks players
Guangdong Southern Tigers players
Medalists at the 2006 Asian Games
Milwaukee Bucks draft picks
Milwaukee Bucks players
National Basketball Association players from China
New Jersey Nets players
Olympic basketball players of China
People from Heshan
Power forwards (basketball)
Texas Legends players
Washington Wizards players
2010 FIBA World Championship players
2006 FIBA World Championship players
2019 FIBA Basketball World Cup players